Valentin Manushev (born 16 August 1967) is a Uzbekistani weightlifter. He competed in the men's heavyweight II event at the 1996 Summer Olympics.

References

1967 births
Living people
Uzbekistani male weightlifters
Olympic weightlifters of Uzbekistan
Weightlifters at the 1996 Summer Olympics
Place of birth missing (living people)
20th-century Uzbekistani people